Dyurmenevo (Dürmän) is a rural locality (a selo) in Chalmalinsky Selsoviet, Sharansky District, Bashkortostan, Russia. The population was 325 as of 2010. There are 3 streets.

Geography 
Dyurmenevo is located 13 km southwest of Sharan (the district's administrative centre) by road. Chalmaly is the nearest rural locality.

References 

Rural localities in Sharansky District